The 3rd Australian Academy of Cinema and Television Arts International Awards (commonly known as the AACTA International Awards), were presented by the Australian Academy of Cinema and Television Arts (AACTA), a non-profit organisation whose aim is to identify, award, promote and celebrate Australia's greatest achievements in film and television. Awards were handed out for the best films of 2013 regardless of geography, and are the international counterpart to the awards for Australian films (held on 28 and 30 January). The ceremony took place at Sunset Marquis in Los Angeles, California on 10 January 2014 and will be televised in Australia on 12 January on the Arena network.

The nominees were announced on 14 December 2013. 12 Years a Slave, American Hustle and Gravity won two awards each, with the latter film winning Best Film. Blue Jasmine was the only other winning film, with one for Best Actress.

Background
The winners and nominees were chosen by the international chapter of the Academy, which comprises eighty members of Australian filmmakers and executives. The finalists in each category were revealed on 13 December 2013 with the winners announced on 10 January 2014 at Sunset Marquis located in West Hollywood, Los Angeles, California. Through a new partnership with Australian subscription television provider Foxtel, the awards, which are usually aired in snippets during the Australian awards ceremony, were televised as a separate presentation for the first time on Arena on 12 January 2014. Two awards for Best Supporting Actor and Best Supporting Actress were added, after being handed out as discretionary accolades the previous year. Additionally, a new lifetime achievement award, the Australian Academy of Cinema and Television Arts International Fellowship, was introduced and given to American film distributor Harvey Weinstein for his work in distributing Australian films internationally. The prize was presented to him on 23 November 2013, at the Canberra International Film Festival.

Winners and nominees
In the following list, the winner is listed first and highlighted in boldface; those that are listed beneath the winner and not highlighted in boldface are the nominees.

See also
 3rd AACTA Awards
 19th Critics’ Choice Awards
 20th Screen Actors Guild Awards
 67th British Academy Film Awards
 71st Golden Globe Awards
 86th Academy Awards

References

External links
 The Official Australian Academy of Cinema and Television Arts website
 Official Website of the AACTA International Awards broadcast

AACTA International Awards
AACTA International Awards
AACTA International Awards
AACTA Awards ceremonies
AACTA International